Udești is a commune located in Suceava County, Bukovina, northeastern Romania. It is composed of eleven villages, more specifically: Chilișeni, Luncușoara, Mănăstioara, Plăvălari, Poieni-Suceava, Racova, Reuseni, Rușii-Mănăstioara, Securiceni, Știrbăț, and Udești.

Natives 

 Traian Popovici

References 

Communes in Suceava County
Localities in Southern Bukovina
Duchy of Bukovina